Crescent Heights, Inc, is an American real estate development company based in Miami, Florida, with offices in Chicago, New York, Los Angeles and San Francisco.

The firm specializes in the development of residential and mixed-use properties, office buildings and hotels.

The firm  is involved in the historic preservation of the Hollywood Palladium  in Los Angeles, also developing two 30-story mixed-use buildings surrounding the venue at approximately 350 feet with 731 market-rate residential units and 24,000 square feet of retail space on Sunset Boulevard. The firm  is currently developing 600 Alton Road in Miami, expected to have 500 units, 60,000 square feet of commercial space and a 3-acre landscaped public park.

History
Crescent Heights was co-founded by Sonny Kahn, Russell W. Galbut and Bruce Menin in 1989. Early real estate development projects in Miami Beach, Florida included the Shelborne, the Alexander, the Decoplage, Carriage Club, and the Casablanca. In 1997, The firm  completed the first office to residential rental conversion in Lower Manhattan of the Broad Exchange Building, a property initially purchased in 1994 for $5 million. The firm  sold the property for $260 million to Swig Equities in 2005.

The firm  bought the Ala Moana Hotel in Honolulu, Hawaii from Japanese firm Azabu USA for $85 million and completed a renovation and conversion of the 1,154-room property into a condo-hotel 

In February 2015, the firm sold its development site at 325 Fremont Street in San Francisco to Fulton Street Ventures for $28.5 million. Later that year,it acquired Hotel Paris on the Upper West Side of Manhattan for $150 million and bought Burnham Pointe, a 298-unit building in the South Loop. The company acquired a building at 165 East 66th Street in Lenox Hill on the Upper East Side for $230 million to remodel it into condominiums; they were sued over allegations of tenant evictions. In 2016, the company agreed to purchase the 55-story, 600-apartment North Harbor Tower in Chicago, for an estimated $200 million.

Per Crain's Chicago Business, in 2022 the company sold a 30-story building Astoria Tower in Miami and was planning to develop a new high-rise on the northern edge of the Fulton Market District and another 47-story, 413-unit apartment tower at 640 W. Washington Blvd.

In May 2020, Crescent Heights bought the West Loop site at 640 W. Washington Blvd. in Chicago from an investment firm Matthew Pritzker Co. for $20.1 million to build a 47-story tower with 413 apartments. For that purpose, Crescent Heights also acquired the 35,000-square-foot parking lot bordered by the expressway, Desplains Street, Washington Boulevard, and Court Place. The project is designed by West Loop-based Hartshorne Plunkard Architecture.

To complete the NEMA Chicago tower project, the company secured a $340 million mortgage loan in 2019 to refinance a previous $328 million loan from KKR Real Estate Finance Trust.

Crescent Heights recently began construction of a 39-story building, called NEMA Miami, located at 2900 Biscayne Boulevard in Miami. The firm obtained a $224 million construction loan from Blackstone for their planned mixed-use development.

Notable projects
NEMA (Chicago) is a 76-story, 800-unit tower located at 1200 South Indiana in Chicago designed by architect Rafael Viñoly with interiors designed by David Rockwell that will be the tallest residential apartment tower in Chicago and tallest building in Chicago south of the Willis Tower. In 2012, thefirm  acquired real estate for the development in the Central Station neighborhood, of the Near South Side, Chicago community area for $29.5 million.

NEMA (San Francisco) is a $300 million, 754-unit apartment building consisting of four linked apartment towers at 10th and Market streets in San Francisco. The building is designed by  Handel Architects, and are LEED Silver certified by the U.S. Green Building Council. In 2015,  thefirm completed a $390 million refinancing of the property.

NEMA (Boston) is a 22-story, 414-unit residential apartment complex at 399 Congress Street in the Seaport District built on a parcel of land purchased for $36 million in 2016.

Ten Thousand is a forty-story, 283-unit project at 10000 Santa Monica Boulevard in Los Angeles designed by Handel Architects.  The development site was purchased in 2010 for $59 million. In March 2018, the project  was certified LEED Gold by the U.S. Green Building Council.

4/C is a proposed 94-story tower in Seattle across from the 76-story Columbia Center, and would be the tallest skyscraper in the Pacific Northwest. The building will be designed by LMN Architects. The firm  bought the property, which consisted of two parking garages, for $48.75 million in September 2015.

10 Van Ness is a planned project in San Francisco that includes two 41-story towers with 984 residences over 30,000 square feet of ground floor retail space, with an alternate submission for a 55-story single tower. In May 2014, the firm  bought the site on the southwest corner of Market Street and Van Ness Avenue for $58.3 million.

11th and Olive is a planned 70-story skyscraper with 794 apartments at 1045 Olive Street in Los Angeles. The firm purchased the half-acre site for $11.5 million. The tower would be the tallest residential building in Los Angeles and the third-tallest building in Los Angeles 

1901 Minor is a planned 39-story twin tower project at the northwest corner of Minor Avenue and Stewart Street in the Denny Triangle area of downtown Seattle with 1004 new residential units. A two-tower design for the project received a 2017 American Architecture Award as one of 79 notable new projects by U.S. firms.

Awards
The Decoplage won South Florida Business Journal's 1993 Renovation and Rehabilitation Project of the Year Award.
In 2006, Crescent Heights was named the Freddie Mac Multifamily Development Firm of the Year by the National Association of Home Builders.
In 2013, Burnham Pointe won a Chicagoland Apartment Marketing and Management Excellence (CAMME) Property Excellence Award for "Best Mid-Rise/High-Rise" built between 2008 and 2012.
In 2014, NEMA won Best New Development of the Year by the San Francisco Apartment Association, the IBcon Digie Award for Most Intelligent Building, Market Rate Rental Project of the Year by the San Francisco Business Times. 
In 2015, NEMA won the Alliant Build America award and the Best Amenities of the Year award by the San Francisco Apartment Association. Jasper received the Market-Rate Residential Deal of the Year Award by the San Francisco Business Times and the Best New Development award from San Francisco Apartment Association. 
In 2016, Jasper won the Concrete Reinforcing Steel Institute HONORS Design and Construction Award for Structural Excellence.
In 2017, Ten Thousand received the 47th Annual Los Angeles Architectural Award by Los Angeles Business Council.	
In 2021, the company's NEMA (Chicago) skyscraper received the Award of Excellence of the Council on Tall Buildings and Urban Habitat (CTBUH) in the category Best Tall Building 200–299 meters.

References

External links

Companies based in Miami
Companies established in 1989
1989 establishments in Florida